FC Vorskla Poltava is a Ukrainian professional football club based in Poltava that competes in the Ukrainian Premier League, the top flight of Ukrainian football.

History

Kolos Poltava
The club draws its history from 1955 when in the city of Poltava was established a football club Kolhospnyk within the republican trade union sports society Kolos. The same year it entered the Football Championship of the Ukrainian SSR where already played one of the older clubs from Poltava, FC Lokomotyv Poltava.

In 1957 the club obtained its professional status and was included in the competitions of the Soviet third division (then "Class B"). However, in 1982 the club went into bankruptcy and was dissolved. In 1983 many players moved to play for an amateur football team Kooperator from Poltava that represented the Poltava Institute of Cooperation. During its history for a short period of time from 1968 to 1972, Kolos was also carrying names Silbud and Budivelnyk.

Vorskla Poltava
In 1984, the club was reanimated based on the Kolos academy (sports school) as Vorskla after the river Vorskla, which flows through Poltava. In 1986, Vorskla entered the Soviet professional ranks of the third division where it participated until the collapse of the Soviet system.

Upon establishing of the Ukrainian football competitions in 1992 the club was admitted to the Ukrainian First League (the second tier of Ukrainian football) which it won in 1996. At that time Vorskla was sponsored by "Poltavagasprom". The team debuted in the Ukrainian Premier League in the 1996–97 season, taking that season the 3rd place. Vorskla have remained in the Premier League since, and participated twice in the UEFA Cup. In 2009, Vorskla met Shakhtar Donetsk in the 2009 Ukrainian Cup Final. Mykola Pavlov's men won the match 1–0 after Vasyl Sachko's goal in the 49th minute.

In 2003-2005, the club was named Vorskla-Naftogaz due to sponsorship reasons.

As a Domestic Cup winner, Vorskla participated in the annual opening game of the season Ukrainian Super Cup meeting the champions Dynamo Kyiv. After a 0–0 draw at full-time, Vorskla lost the cup to Dynamo on penalties.

The first team plays its home matches at Butovsky Memorial Vorskla Stadium which is named after one of the founders of the modern Olympic games and the International Olympic Committee in 1894.

One of the biggest successes of Vorskla in European competition was their qualification to the 2011–12 UEFA Europa League group phase.

On 26 July 2014, the club's president Oleh Babayev was shot dead, while police has opened a criminal cases under Article “premeditated murder".

In the 2017-18 season, the club finished third in the top division for the first time since the 1996-97 season.

Stadium

Vorskla plays its games at Oleksiy Butovskyi Vorskla Stadium (Ukrainian: Стадіон «Ворскла» імені Олексія Бутовського). Vorskla has been playing there since 1955. The stadium underwent significant reconstruction between 1968 and 1975 and 1995 and 2000.

Supporters & Rivalries
Development of fan movement in Poltava started in 1985. Then on the stadium began to appear first green-white scarves and fan chants. In the 1990s, fans began to actively go abroad. In particular Vorskla fans were present at the legendary match between Ukraine and Russia October 9, 1999 in Moscow. European competition games with FC Daugava from Latvia and Anderlecht from Brussels in 1997 allowed fans try their hand on the European stage.

The largest fan club is known as the Crew of Golden Eagle.

Vorskla maintains friendly relations with Shakhtar Donetsk and Chornomorets Odesa fans. Strained relations with: Metalist Kharkiv, Karpaty Lviv, Dynamo Kyiv, Dnipro Dnipropetrovsk, Zorya Luhansk and Obolon Kyiv. Now all fans have declared a truce because of the war in Eastern Ukraine.

Reserve teams
The reserve team of Vorskla, Vorskla Poltava Reserves are playing in the Ukrainian Premier Reserve League.

There also was FC Vorskla-2 Poltava.

Honours
 Ukrainian Premier League
 Third place (2): 1996–97, 2017–18
Ukrainian Cup
 Winner (1): 2008–09
Runners-up (1):  2019–20
Ukrainian Persha Liha
Winner (1): 1995–96
Football championship of the Ukrainian SSR (part of the Soviet Second League)
Runners-up (1): 1988
Football Cup of the Ukrainian SSR
 Winner (1): 1956
Ukrainian KFK competitions (amateur competitions)
Winners (1): 1986

Kit manufacturers and sponsors

European record

Its first European competition participation occurred in 1997–98 season in UEFA Cup. Vorskla played its first game at this level away at Daugava Stadium in Riga on July 23, 1997 against the Latvian club Daugava Rīga.

Vorskla did not achieve any noticeable feats yet managed to qualify on couple of occasions to the Europe League group stage.

Its home games the club plays at Vorskla Stadium.

Players

Current squad

Out on loan

Coaches and administration

Head coaches

League and Cup history

Soviet Union
Kolos

Vorskla

Ukraine

References

External links

Official website
Fan website

 
Vorskla Poltava
Association football clubs established in 1955
1955 establishments in Ukraine
Football clubs in the Ukrainian Soviet Socialist Republic
Vorskla Poltava
Naftogaz
Kolos (sports society)
Agrarian association football clubs in Ukraine